Çetin Tekindor (born 16 July 1945) is a Turkish actor.

Biography
Çetin Tekindor was born in 1945 in Sivas. After studying theatre at the Ankara State Conservatory, he made his professional acting debut in a play IV. Murat in 1970. Beside acting, he also gave acting lessons at the Hacettepe University State Conservatory and Bilkent University.

In 1983, he made his television debut in Küçük Ağa directed by Yücel Çakmaklı. In 1987, he made his film debut in Kaçamak which starred Başar Sabuncu and Müjde Ar. In 2003 won the Best Actor award at the Ankara Film Festival for his role in Karşılaşma. For his role in Babam ve Oğlum, he won the Best Actor awards at the 13th ÇASOD awards and the 27th SİYAD Turkish cinema awards.

Theatre

Filmography

Film

Television

Short film

Commercials

References

External links
 
 

1945 births
Living people
People from Sivas
Turkish male film actors
Turkish male television actors
Turkish male stage actors